Blondie is a term sometimes used to refer to a person with blond hair.

Blondie or Blondi may also refer to:

People
 Blondie (nickname), a list of people
 Debbie Harry, the lead singer of the band Blondie who is sometimes erroneously referred to by that name

Arts and entertainment
 Blondie (band), an American rock band formed in 1974
 Blondie (album), 1976 debut album from Blondie
 Blondi (EP), a 2005 EP by German musician Wumpscut
 Blondie (comic strip), a long-running newspaper comic strip named after its blond-haired main character, launched in 1930
 Blondie (1938 film), first in a series of movies based on the comic strip
 Blondie (radio) (1939–1950), a radio comedy series based on the comic strip
 Blondie (1957 TV series), the NBC TV series based on the comic strip
 Blondie (1968 TV series), the updated, short-lived, CBS TV series based on the comic strip
 Blondie (1975 film), a French film
 Blondie (2012 film), a Swedish film
 Blondie, the title character of the film Blondie Johnson (1933), played by Joan Blondell
 Blondie, the nickname of the Man with No Name, Clint Eastwood's nameless character in The Good, the Bad and the Ugly (1966)

Other uses
 Blondie (confection), a brownie made without chocolate
 Blondi, Adolf Hitler's German Shepherd dog
 Blondie, the reserve boat of the Cambridge University Women's Boat Club (founded 1940)

See also 
 Theraphosa blondi (Goliath birdeater), a species of tarantula in the family Theraphosidae
 Blondy (disambiguation)